Greenfield-Central Community School Corporation (GCSC) or Greenfield-Central Schools is a school district headquartered in Greenfield, Indiana.

History

In 2019 the Indiana State Board of Accounts found that administrators of the GCSC received $651,000 more than they were supposed to, and as a result started a criminal investigation.

In 2019 the school district revised its administrative structure.

Schools
 Secondary
 Greenfield-Central High School
 Greenfield-Central Junior High School

 Primary
 Intermediate schools:
 Greenfield Intermediate School
 Maxwell Intermediate School in Maxwell
 Elementary schools:
 Eden
 Harris
 J. B. Stephens
 Weston

References

External links
 Greenfield-Central Community School Corporation
 Greenfield-Central School Foundation
School districts in Indiana
Education in Hancock County, Indiana